Irene Vorrink (7 January 1918 – 21 August 1996) was a Dutch politician of the Labour Party (PvdA).

She was born on 7 January 1918 in The Hague as the daughter of the Dutch socialist leader Koos Vorrink. She studied law until 1943 and held several legal functions, before she became a member of the Senate for the PvdA in 1969.

In 1973 she became Minister of Health in the cabinet Den Uyl. A major issue was the legislation concerning drugs, which she achieved in 1976 together with Minister of Justice, Dries van Agt. The Netherlands has since then employed a distinction between hard and soft drugs.

She also took the leading role in attempting to establish a legal basis for the fluoridation of drinking water. Though fluoridation to prevent tooth decay had been occurring in many areas across the Netherlands for years, the Supreme Court ruled in 1973 that it should be specifically provided for in the Water Supply law. Her bill to do so did not find support in the House of Representatives outside her own party, and was dropped.

From 1978 until 1979 Vorrink was an alderman in the city of Amsterdam. A 16 MW nearshore wind farm in the IJsselmeer was named after her in 1996.

References

External links

Official
  Mr. I. (Irene) Vorrink Parlement & Politiek
  Mr. I. Vorrink (PvdA) Eerste Kamer der Staten-Generaal

 

1918 births
1996 deaths
Aldermen of Amsterdam
Dutch newspaper editors
Dutch nonprofit directors
Dutch women jurists
Labour Party (Netherlands) politicians
Members of the Senate (Netherlands)
Ministers of Health of the Netherlands
Politicians from The Hague
University of Amsterdam alumni
Women government ministers of the Netherlands
20th-century Dutch civil servants
20th-century Dutch educators
20th-century Dutch women politicians
20th-century Dutch politicians
20th-century Dutch women writers
20th-century Dutch journalists